Noel Hoefenmayer (born January 6, 1999) is a Canadian professional ice hockey defenceman who is currently playing for the  Toronto Marlies of the American Hockey League (AHL).

Early life
Hoefenmayer was born on January 6, 1999, in North York, Ontario, Canada.

Playing career
Growing up in North York, Hoefenmayer played junior ice hockey for the Don Mills Flyers Minor Midget where he recorded ten goals and 23 assists in 62 games during the 2014–15 season. During this time, he also competed for Team GTHL Blue at the 2015 OHL Gold Cup Championship, winning the tournament. As a result of his offensive output, Hoefenmayer was drafted by the Ottawa 67's in the 2015 Ontario Hockey League (OHL) Priority Selection.

By January 2017, Hoefenmayer recorded eight goals and 15 assists for 23 points which earned him a 38th overall ranking by the NHL Central Scouting Bureau's midterm rankings list. He concluded the season with 14 goals and 40 points in 62 games but dropped to 75th overall amongst North American skaters. Despite this, he was selected 108th overall by the Arizona Coyotes in the 2017 NHL Entry Draft. Hoefenmayer also received the Ottawa 67's Top Defenseman Award at the conclusion of the season.

After the Coyotes chose to leave Hoefenmayer unsigned, he remained in Ottawa to work with the 67s strength and conditioning coach and the skills team. In his final OHL season, Hoefenmayer led defensemen with 26 goals and 82 points over 58 games. His 56 assists and plus-52 rating each ranked second in the league. As a result, he was awarded the Max Kaminsky Trophy as the CHL's Defenceman of the Year and selected for the 2019–20 OHL First All-Star Team.

Professional
On April 4, 2020, Hoefenmayer signed as a free agent to a two-year American Hockey League (AHL) contract with the Toronto Marlies, primary affiliate to the Toronto Maple Leafs. Following the signing, he played 18 games with the Marlies before being re-assigned to the Wichita Thunder in the ECHL. As a result of his past seasons play, Hoefenmayer was named to the Maple Leafs' 2021 Prospect Tournament roster.

On June 16, 2022, Hoefenmayer opted to continue his tenure within the Marlies organization, re-signing to a one-year contract extension for the 2022–23 season.

Career statistics

Awards and honours

References

External links

1999 births
Living people
Arizona Coyotes draft picks
Canadian ice hockey defencemen
Newfoundland Growlers players
Ottawa 67's players
Sportspeople from North York
Ice hockey people from Toronto
Toronto Marlies players
Wichita Thunder players
21st-century Canadian people